The 1963–64 Israel State Cup (Gvia HaMedina) was the 25th season of Israel's nationwide football cup competition and the 10th after the Israeli Declaration of Independence.

For this edition, which began on 21 September 1963, the IFA experimented with the competition's format, holding just one preliminary round, before entering all the teams, including Liga Leumit and Liga Alef teams into the competition in the second round. This move brought high scoring results in matches in which top tier teams met lower tier opponents, including a record 20–0 result in the match between Hapoel Ramat Gan and Liga Gimel team Beitar Ein Karem.

The final, between Maccabi Tel Aviv and Hapoel Haifa, took two replays to be settled, the first two matches ending with a 1–1 draw. Maccabi Tel Aviv won the third match 2–1 to win its 11th cup. International edición vs Argentine Clubs.

Results

First round 
(Selected results)

The 98 first round matches were played on 21 September 1963. However, for 50 matches a walkover win was given as teams failed to show up or failed to invite a referee for the match.

Second round 
In addition to the 49 match winners from the first round, all the other league teams, including Liga Leumit and Liga Alef teams entered the competition.

The matches were played on 5 October 1963.

Third round 
Most of the matches were played on 4 and 5 February 1964. However, due to weather conditions, some of the matches were played later during February 1964. 
Two ties took even longer to be settled. Maccabi Jaffa were beaten at home by Hapoel Ashkelon 3–4 (after leading 3–1 at the 85th minute and conceding three goals at the final five minutes), and appealed the result due to Hapoel Ashkelon fielding an ineligible player. Eventually the IFA ordered a replay, played on 17 June 1964, in which Maccabi Jaffa lost once again.
A similar appeal in the tie between Hapoel Netanya and Hapoel Haifa, eventually won 2–0 by the former, resulted at first in a walkover win for Hapoel Haifa, and later in a replay, played on 5 September 1964, in which Hapoel Haifa won 6–1.

Fourth round 
Following the third round, an intermediate round had to be played in order to bring the number of contestants to 32. 14 of the third round winners were drawn to play, while the other teams received a bye to the fifth round. Matches in this round were all played on 18 February 1964.

Fifth round

Replay

Sixth round

Quarter-finals

Semi-finals

Final

Replay

Second Replay

Notes

References 
 100 Years of Football 1906-2006, Elisha Shohat (Israel), 2006

External links 
 Israel Football Association website

Israel State Cup
State Cup
State Cup
Israel State Cup seasons